Jane Forman (born January 21, 1962) is an American former professional tennis player.

Born in Providence, Forman played college tennis with Clemson University in the early 1980s. She was a three-time singles All-American for Clemson and was twice named ACC Player of the Year.

Forman qualified for her first grand slam main draw at the 1983 US Open and her best performance was a second round appearance at the 1986 Wimbledon Championships, where after beating Eva Pfaff she fell to the top seed and eventual champion Martina Navratilova.

Since 1990 she has run the Jane Forman Tennis Academy in Miami-Dade.

References

External links
 
 

1962 births
Living people
American female tennis players
Clemson Tigers women's tennis players
Tennis people from Rhode Island
Sportspeople from Providence, Rhode Island